Moléson-sur-Gruyères (also known as Moléson-Village) is a village in the Swiss Alps, located in the canton of Fribourg. The village is situated in the municipality of Gruyères, south of Bulle, at a height of 1,132 metres above sea level.

The village sits at the foot of the Moléson (2,002 m) which can be easily reached by Funiculaire Moléson-sur-Gruyères – Plan-Francey and an aerial cable car. In winter the area functions as a ski resort.

References
Swisstopo topographic maps

External links
Official website
Moléson-sur-Gruyères on Wanderland.ch

Villages in the canton of Fribourg
Ski areas and resorts in Switzerland
Gruyères